Dianra Department is a department of Béré Region in Woroba District, Ivory Coast. In 2021, its population was 119,146 and its seat is the settlement of Dianra. The sub-prefectures of the department are Dianra and Dianra-Village.

History
Dianra Department was created in 2012 by dividing Mankono Department.

Notes

Departments of Béré Region
States and territories established in 2012
2012 establishments in Ivory Coast